means "tight binding," while  literally means "the beauty of tight binding."  is a Japanese style of bondage or BDSM which involves tying a person up using simple yet visually intricate patterns, usually with several pieces of thin rope (often jute, hemp or linen and generally around  in diameter, but sometimes as small as , and between  long. The allusion is to the use of hemp rope for restraining prisoners, as a symbol of power, in the same way that stocks or manacles are used in a Western BDSM context.
The word  came into common use in the West at some point in the 1990s to describe the bondage art Kinbaku.  is a Japanese word that broadly means "binding" or "tying" in most contexts, but is used in BDSM to refer to this style of decorative bondage.

History 
Bondage as a sexual activity first came to notice in Japan in the late Edo period (about 1600s to 1860s). Generally recognized as "father of Kinbaku" is Seiu Ito, who started studying and researching Hojōjutsu (the art of binding a prisoner of war) and is credited with the inception of Kinbaku, though it is noted that he drew inspiration from other art forms of the time including Kabuki theatre and Ukiyoe woodblock prints. Kinbaku became widely popular in Japan in the 1950s through magazines such as Kitan Club and Yomikiri Romance, which published the first naked bondage photographs. In the 1960s, people such as Eikichi Osada began to appear performing live SM shows often including a large amount of rope bondage, today these performers are often referred to as Nawashi (rope master) or Bakushi (from kinbakushi, meaning bondage master).

In recent years, Kinbaku has become popular in the Western BDSM scene in its own right and has also profoundly influenced bondage, combining to produce many 'fusion' styles.

Rope types 
In Japan the most often used type of rope is a loose laid, three strand jute rope. This rope is referred to as "Asanawa" usually translated as "hemp rope" the word 'asa' as hemp and 'nawa' as rope, however this is using the more generic form of the word [hemp] referring to a range of natural fibre ropes rather than those pertaining to a particular plant.
In recent history a range of rope types have been used for Kinbaku in Japan though Nawashi rarely use synthetic fibre rope and most often use jute.

Due to the generally larger physique of Western subjects,  ropes are commonly used in the West. Though the rope material is usually jute (or hemp) many other materials are in use including cotton and various synthetics. Various techniques are used to make the natural fiber ropes softer.

Synthetic ropes have become popular in the USA for the vibrant colors which are available and ease of washing.  Most commonly 6mm diameter, but also 8mm diameter and other sizes.  The most common standard length is 30 feet or ten meters, however many vendors provide custom lengths.

Aesthetics of Japanese bondage 
The aesthetics of the bound person's position is important: in particular, Japanese bondage is distinguished by its use of specific katas (forms) and aesthetic rules. Sometimes, asymmetric and often intentionally uncomfortable positions are employed. In particular, Japanese bondage is very much about the way the rope is applied and the pleasure is more in the journey than the destination. In this way the rope becomes an extension of the nawashi's hands and is used to communicate.

Traditional Japanese bondage techniques use natural vegetable fiber rope (hemp, jute, or linen) exclusively, though contemporary Japanese Masters have been working with a range of rope materials. The natural fibers easily lock to each other which means the bondage can be held together by the friction of twists and turns or very simple knots.

Shibari in contemporary art 

Shibari has a strong presence in the works of some renowned contemporary artists, mainly photographers, like Nobuyoshi Araki in Japan, Jim Duvall in the United States and Hikari Kesho in Europe.

In 2014, Romanian singer-songwriter NAVI released a Shibari-themed music video, "Picture Perfect". The video, directed by Marian Nica, was controversial and banned by Romanian television for its explicit erotic content.

Shibari has also featured in Western pop culture. For example, in the music video for The Jonas Brothers song "Sucker," Joe Jonas and Sophie Turner briefly appear to be engaging in a form of Japanese-inspired bondage. More to the point, shibari is explicitly referenced in "Tying the Knot," the nineteenth episode of The Good Wife's fifth season, as the practice of shibari is integral to the episode's plot; in this episode, fictional characters Colin Sweeney and Renata Ellard Sweeney (portrayed by actors Dylan Baker and Laura Benanti respectively) are revealed to engage in the art of shibari, and shibari is also used as a means by which Renata's friend, Morgan Donnelly (portrayed by actress Jenn Gambatese), is murdered.

One modern distinction that has gained popularity among westerners wanting to distinguish the terms is that shibari refers to purely artistic, aesthetic rope, while kinbaku refers to the artistic, connective, sensual, sexual practice as a whole. While multiple books and articles have been written in Japanese about shibari, no one has found evidence of there being any thought given to the distinction between these words among Japanese practitioners of the art.

A traditional view is that the term  is a Western misuse of Japanese vocabulary. The word denotes tying in Japanese, but in a generic way, and traditionally not in the context of bondage. The names for many particular ties include , but it was not traditional to name the entire activity in that way.  Instead,  is the term for artistic or erotic tying within traditional Japanese rope bondage circles. 
An even more traditional view is that shibari is a term used for erotic bondage in Japan that is practically interchangeable with the term kinbaku. Itoh Seiu (generally considered one of the fathers of contemporary Japanese rope bondage) used the term in the 1950s, with no sign of it being a "western Japonism" as did many other well-known Japanese . One of Nureki Chimuo's how-to video series from the 1980s, is titled Introduction to Shibari.

While some claim this is a somewhat hidebound definition and the word shibari is now increasingly being re-imported from the West to Japan, as the tying communities are very close-knit, there is no evidence to support such a conclusion as most practicing  in Japan have very limited contact with the west and almost no interest in debating the meaning of words. Most Japanese  do not object to the term , as it is common vernacular in the global community.

The actual term Kinbaku was first developed and used in the May–June 1952 issue of Kitan Club by author and Bakushi Minomura Kou and Bakushi Tsujimura Takashi. Until that issue, most magazines only had nude photographs of women but few in bondage. In order to specify the act of erotic bondage as opposed to the act of just tying Kinbaku was then created by the aforementioned Bakushi.

Technique 

Kinbaku is based on fairly specific rope patterns, many of them derived from Hojojutsu ties though significantly modified to make them safer for bondage use. Many Hojojutsu ties were deliberately designed to cause harm to a prisoner and are therefore not suitable for erotic bondage. Of particular importance are the Ushiro Takatekote (a type of box tie which surrounds the chest and arms), which forms the basis of many Kinbaku ties, and the Ebi-tie, or "Shrimp", which was originally designed as a torture tie and codified as part of the Edo period torture techniques.

Glossary 
 : (noun) literally "tight binding". It does not convey the meaning of sexual bondage outside SM circles. However, some experts, e.g. Kinoko Hajime and Osada Steve, make a distinction from "shibari" in that it is used to refer to sessions with a strong emotional exchange.
 : (noun) kinbaku master, can be shortened to bakushi.
 : (noun) the act of tying, binding or weaving. It does not convey the meaning of sexual bondage outside SM circles.
 : (verb) tie or bind with a rope
 : (noun) rope-tying with a rope (an incorrect, "made-up" term, does not exist in Japanese)
 : (noun) literally, "a maker of rope", but in SM circles it means a professional "rope artist"

Kinbaku patterns 

Most of the patterns below have multiple variations:
 Ushiro takate kote – Foundational form for most shibari ties, capturing the upper body / breasts and arms behind back (when ushiro) in a "U" shape behind the back
 Single wrist binding 片手首縛り Katate kubi shibari
 Both wrists binding 両手首縛り Ryoute kubi shibari
 Handcuff binding 手錠縛り Tejou shibari
 Prisoner handcuff binding 連行手錠縛り Renkou tejou shibari
 Hands behind the back binding 後ろ手縛り Ushiro te shibari
 High hands behind the back binding 後ろ高手小手縛り(簡易型 Ushiro takate kote shibari)
 Hands behind the head tie 後頭後ろ手縛り Koutou ushiro te shibari
 Tasuki (kimono string) tied 襷(タスキ)縛り Tasuki (tasuki ) shibari
 Crotch rope tie また縄縛り Mata nawa shibari
 Turtle (diamond pattern) binding 亀甲縛り(菱縄縛り) Kikkou shibari (hishi nawa shibari)
 Upright standing binding 直立不動一本縛り Chokuritsu fudou ippon shibari
 Cross-legged binding 胡座 縛り Agura shibari
 Shrimp binding 海老縛り Ebi shibari
 Reverse shrimp binding 逆さ海老縛り Sakasa ebi shibari
 Standing partial suspension 立ち吊り縛り Tachi tsuri shibari
 One foot lifted partial suspension 片足上げ吊り縛り１ Kataashi age tsuri shibari
 Hanging letter M, open leg binding Ｍ字開脚吊り縛り M ji kaikyaku tsuri shibari
 Reverse hanging shrimp binding 逆海老吊り縛り Gyaku ebi tsuri shibari
 Reverse prayer hands 後手 合掌 縛り – Gote gasshou shibari
 Arms bound in front 前手 肘 縛り – Maete hiji shibari
 Legs bound together 両足 合体 – 文字 縛り– Ryouashi gattai Ichimonji Shibari
 Rifle tie 鉄砲 縛り– Teppou shibari
 Leg, calf to thigh 太もも – Futomomo
 High hands on front tie 前方 高手 縛り– Zenpou takate shibari

Vocabulary 
Topics in Japanese bondage include:
 Karada – a Japanese word used in the West for body (body harness, a "rope dress")
 Kikkou – a body tie that ends with a tortoise shell design in the front upper torso.
 Hishi – a tie using diamond shapes. When done as a full body tie, it is sometimes also called hishi-kikkou. The hishi has been popularized by manga, or cartoon, art.
 Ebi – the "shrimp" tie
 Agoura – a less severe tie similar to an ebi
 Tazuki – a "criss-cross harness"
 Tanuki – a "raccoon dog"
 Kataashi tsuri – a "one-legged suspension"
 Asymmetric bondage – a common feature of Japanese bondage
 Tsuri suspension
 Gyaku ebi
 Hojojutsu

See also 
 Bondage positions and methods

Notes

References

Further reading 
 Harrington, Lee. Shibari You Can Use: Japanese Rope Bondage and Erotic Macramé. Mystic Productions, 2007. .
 Master "K". Shibari: The Art of Japanese Bondage. Secret Publications, 2004. .
 Master "K". The Beauty of Kinbaku (Or everything you always wanted to know about Japanese erotic bondage when you suddenly realized you didn't speak Japanese.). King Cat Ink, 2008. .
 Masami Akita (秋田昌美 Akita Masami), while known primarily as a musician, has produced an extensive number of scholarly writings on the history and practice of Japanese bondage.
 Midori and Craig Morey (photographer). The Seductive Art of Japanese Bondage. Greenery Press, 2001. .

External links 

 La quarta corda — Safety guidelines for bondage and shibari
 Nawame — The first free webbook on Japanese bondage.

Bondage (BDSM)
Japanese sex terms
Decorative ropework
Sexuality in Japan